Line 5 is a rapid transit line in the Madrid Metro system since 5 June 1968. It is the fourth most used line of the Madrid system, transporting 64 million passengers a year. It is 27 kilometers long.

Line 5 also contains the only elevated ground platform in the Madrid Metro, at  station. Aluche is also the only station where the metro is above the Cercanías commuter train, which generally runs above ground.

History

On the 27 October 1999,  was added as an infill station between Aluche and Carabanchel. The station is on the tunnel mouth of the line and is therefore at-grade.

2017 improvements
Line 5 was closed during the summer of 2017 for renovation. The renovation lasted 62 days and cost an estimated €66.5 million.

Future
Line 5 is to be extended through the town of Barajas and ultimately connect with Valdebebas railway station, which at the time only serves the Cercanías network.

Rolling stock
Line 5 uses 6-car trains of mainly class 2000B, however there are a few class 2000As running on the line. It was the last line built in a narrow profile and gauge.

Gallery

See also
 Madrid
 Transport in Madrid
 List of Madrid Metro stations
 List of metro systems

References

External links

  Madrid Metro (official website)
 Schematic map of the Metro network – from the official site 
 Madrid at UrbanRail.net
 ENGLISH User guide, ticket types, airport supplement and timings
 Network map (real-distance)
 Madrid Metro Map

05 (Madrid Metro)
Railway lines opened in 1968
1968 establishments in Spain